Braslaw District is a district in the Vitebsk Region, Belarus. Its administrative centre is Braslaw.

Braslau Raion is famous for its numerous lakes. The National Park and popular tourist region Braslau Lakes is situated here. The largest lakes are Dryvyaty (the fifth largest in Belarus), Snudy (the ninth largest in Belarus), Strusto (the sixteenth largest in Belarus), Richi (the seventeenth largest in Belarus).

Notable residents 
 Alesia Furs (1925, Aziarava village - 2017), member of the Belarusian independence movement and Anti-Soviet resistance and a Gulag prisoner.
 Tomasz Wawrzecki (1753, Mejšty estate –1816), politician and military commander

References

 
Districts of Vitebsk Region